Amoria weldensis is a species of sea snail, a marine gastropod mollusk in the family Volutidae, the volutes.

Description
The shell grows to a length of 75 mm.

Distribution
This marine species occurs off Northwest Australia.

References

 Bail P. & Limpus A. (2001) The genus Amoria. In: G.T. Poppe & K. Groh (eds) A conchological iconography. Hackenheim: Conchbooks. 50 pp., 93 pls.

External links
 

Volutidae
Gastropods described in 2001